Uncoordinated-119 (Unc-119) is a protein that has been identified in C. elegans, humans, mice, zebrafish, rabbits, pig, calf, monkey, and protozoa. They have been classified in the GMP phosphodiesterase, delta superfamily.  Unc-119 proteins are categorized into their own family but are shown to be ancestrally related to PrBP (prenyl binding protein) and rhoGDI. It has been given many different names: Retinal Protein 4, HRG4, POC7 Centriolar Protein Homolog A, IMD13, POC7A, and RG4.

Structure and function 
Unc-119 in C. elegans is approximately 240 amino acids and has a mass of ~26 kDa. Using x-ray crystallography the protein's crystal structure was observed and found to have a resolution of 1.95 Å. It has an immunoglobulin-like β-sandwich folding structure, resulting in a narrow, hydrophobic pocket. This pocket has ability to bind to lauroyl (C12) and myristoyl (C14) acyltransferase side chains as a transporter or lipid-binding chaperone. Unc-119 helps with motility of cilium. It is needed for cilia to maintain formation and function. This is a conserved responsibility from animals to protozoa.

Role in cells 
UNC-119 has been found to be involved in synaptic functions, signal transduction, endosome recycling, uptake of bacteria and endocytosis, protein trafficking, lipid-binding chaperone, and a mediator on Src family kinase signals.

The UNC-119 protein plays key roles in the movement and feeding in the C. elegans, because it is essential in the development and function of their nervous system. One mutation observed was in the expression patterns when the mutant fuses with lacZ. When this protein is mutated or deleted, C. elegans were found to have problems moving, even to the point of complete paralysis. It was also proposed that a mutation could cause the C. elegans to lose the ability to recognize their food. When the organism possesses a mutated UNC-119, they have been shown to experience uncoordinated movement, a defect causing weak egg laying, and the inability to form dauer larvae.

In H. sapiens, Unc-119 has been identified on chromosome 17  and is found predominantly in the retina (HRG4). It has been localized to the photo-receptor synapses in the outer plexiform layer of the retina, and suggested to play a role in the mechanism of photoreceptor neurotransmitter release through the synaptic vesicle cycle. Two transcript variants encoding different isoforms have been described for this gene. The encoded product shares strong homology with the C. elegans unc119 protein and it can functionally complement the C. elegans unc119 mutation.

Unc-119 has also been identified in other areas in humans, such as the liver, kidneys, brain, and fibroblasts. It has also been found to play an important role within the T-cell receptor function and interleukin-5 receptor (IL-5R) Unc-119 is an essential activator of both Lck and Fyn by interacting with their SH2- and SH3-binding domains. Mutation of the Unc-119 gene has been found to severely disrupt the T-cell receptor pathway. It has been suggested to be a cause of an immunodeficiency disordered known as idiopathic CD4 lymphopenia (ICL) due to the reduced t-cell stimulation.

Interactions 

Protein unc-119 homolog has been shown to interact with:

 ARL2 
 ARL3 
 CD247 
 CD4
 FYN 
 IL5RA 
 LYN 
 Lck
 RIBEYE

References

Further reading

External links